The Heitlistock is a mountain of the Urner Alps, located between the Klein Melchtal and the Melchtal in the canton of Obwalden. It is situated west of Stöckalp.

References

External links
 Heitlistock on Hikr

Mountains of the Alps
Mountains of Obwalden
Mountains of Switzerland